The Boston Bears were a member of the American Soccer League, competing in 1931 and 1932.

Year-by-year

Bears
Defunct soccer clubs in Massachusetts
American Soccer League (1921–1933) teams
1931 establishments in Massachusetts
1932 establishments in Massachusetts
Association football clubs established in 1931
Association football clubs disestablished in 1932